Sylvain Content (born 22 January 1971) is a Mauritian former international footballer who played as a defender. He won two caps for the Mauritius national football team.

References

1971 births
Living people
Mauritian footballers
Mauritius international footballers
Pamplemousses SC players

Association football defenders